Cortinarius magellanicus is a species of agaric fungus in the family Cortinariaceae. It was described as new to science by mycologist Carlos Luigi Spegazzini in 1887. It has been found in South America and New Zealand, although collections made from the latter location appears to be genetically distinct from South American material.

See also
List of Cortinarius species

References

External links

magellanicus
Fungi described in 1887
Fungi of South America
Fungi of New Zealand
Taxa named by Carlo Luigi Spegazzini